Isosakuranetin, an O-methylated flavonoid, is the 4'-methoxy derivative of naringenin, a flavanone. Didymin, a disaccharide of isosakuranetin, occur e.g. in sweet orange, blood orange and mandarin. Isosakuranetin is a potent inhibitor of TRPM3 channels.

Glycosides 
 Poncirin is the 7-O-neohesperidoside of isosakuranetin.
 Didymin is the 7-O-rutinoside of isosakuranetin

References 

O-methylated flavanones
Flavonoids found in Rutaceae
Resorcinols